Brian Aitken is an American marketing consultant, entrepreneur, and writer.

In 2009, Aitken became a cause célèbre among gun-rights activists in the United States, after he was convicted and sentenced to seven years in prison for possessing handguns legally purchased in Colorado and transported in New Jersey from one residence to another. Aitken spent four months in prison before New Jersey Governor Chris Christie commuted Aitken's sentence to time served. In 2012, the New Jersey Superior Court, Appellate Division and the State of New Jersey dismissed three illegal possession of firearms convictions and in 2018 Aitken was pardoned by Governor Christie.

After his release, commutation, and pardon, Aitken has written extensively in support of criminal justice reform, focusing on first and second amendment issues.

Background
Aitken states on his website that he is a digital marketer and entrepreneur who formerly worked for Edelman Digital. Aitken writes that he is a past Webby Award nominee.

Aitken was born in Pennsylvania and moved to Colorado, where he married a fellow New Jersey émigré and became a legal resident. After his divorce, he returned to New Jersey, where he had attended college to be near his young son and other family members. During the course of his move back to New Jersey, he made several trips by commercial airline to and from Colorado. Prior to the last trip, he reviewed guidance from the United States Department of Homeland Security Transportation Security Administration to ensure he could legally transport three handguns in his checked luggage.

Arrest
On January 2, 2009, Aitken's mother dialed 911 while Aitken was packing his car to move to Hoboken.  His mother, "a social worker trained to be sensitive to suicidal indicators" hung-up the phone before the call was answered. The Mount Laurel Police Department responded to an abandoned 911 call to find that Aitken had said he "didn't see the point in being here if he couldn't see [his] son". This vague comment relayed to the police caused them to call Aitken on his cell phone to determine his 'state of mind'. Aitken told the officers he was not suicidal at which point Officer Michael Joy asked Aitken to return to Mount Laurel. Aitken asked if he was legally required to return to which Officer Joy responded that he did not have to return to Mount Laurel. Aitken thanked Officer Joy and stated that he would not be returning; however, minutes later Officer Joy made another call to Aitken notifying him that a 'General Alert' had been issued to New Jersey jurisdictions and that the Police would "pick him up" and "bring him back" if he did not return on his own. Officer Joy testified at trial that Aitken was "not free to leave until we're through with the matter" despite the fact that Aitken had not been charged with, or suspected of committing, a crime.

Fearing a manhunt, Aitken returned to Mount Laurel and the responding officers searched Aitken's car and discovered three locked and unloaded handguns in the trunk. Aitken was subsequently arrested for possession of these weapons and was sentenced to seven years in prison by Judge James Morley. Judge Morley's decision not to provide information to the jury regarding exceptions to New Jersey's relatively strict firearm possession laws became a source of controversy. Gun laws in the United States vary widely by state and require expert knowledge to understand the differences.

During the jury instructions, Judge Morley did not charge the jury with the exemptions to the New Jersey law despite arguments by the defense that Aitken met one of the exemptions and was therefore innocent of the charges. The jury returned three times requesting to be made aware of the laws that provide exemptions for lawful possession; however, all three requests were denied by the judge. One of the jury requests read:
Why did you make us aware at the start of the trial that the law allows a person to carry a weapon if the person is moving or going to a shooting range, and during the trial both the defense and prosecution presented testimony as to whether or not the defendant was in the process of moving, and then in your charge for us to deliberate we are not permitted to take into consideration whether or not we believe the defendant was moving?

In an interview with ABC News, Joel Bewley, a spokesman for the Burlington County Prosecutor's Office, stated

The defendant's attorneys presented evidence that his house was for sale and that at the time of arrest he was traveling from one residence in New Jersey to another.

Release and continued appeals
On December 20, 2010, after Aitken had spent four months in prison, New Jersey Governor Chris Christie commuted Aitken's sentence to time served, and Aitken was released from Mid-State Correctional Annex.

On March 30, 2012, the New Jersey Superior Court, Appellate Division issued a decision overturning Aitken's conviction for second-degree unlawful possession of a weapon and fourth-degree possession of a large-capacity ammunition magazine, but affirming his conviction for fourth-degree possession of prohibited ammunition (hollow point bullets). On the hollow point bullets charge, the court rejected Aitken's argument that the statute was unconstitutionally vague or that the "moving exemption" that applies to other gun laws (allowing owners to transport from one house to another while moving) should be read into the prohibited-ammunition statute, which does not contain such an exemption.

On January 12, 2018, Governor Christie pardoned Brian Aitken on the hollow point bullets charge along with several others for charges related to entering New Jersey with firearms.

Post-release activities

In 2011, Aitken gave talks to a local Tea Party group and addressed the Students for Liberty at its annual conference.

In 2014, Aitken crowdfunded over $40,000 via Indiegogo to publish a memoir, petition the Supreme Court of the United States, and attempt to gain custody of his son. After being released, Aitken announced plans to file a 42 U.S.C. § 1983 civil-rights lawsuit against the police officers, the prosecutor and the judge for their actions in the case and also to seek custody of his son.

Arrest for attempted murder
On November 19, 2021, Aitken was arrested after a shooting took place at his home in Telluride, Colorado. He is accused of shooting at the back of a man working at his house, while the man was walking away from him.  Motions hearing set for June 16, 2023 with trial set to start on July 31,2023.  Brian's personal decisions in contrary to his book are the reason for his lost freedom and son.

References

External links
 Aitken's website

Living people
Gun politics in the United States
People from Mount Laurel, New Jersey
Year of birth missing (living people)